Club Deportivo Segovia Futsal, is a futsal club based in Segovia, city of the Province of Segovia in the autonomous community of Castile and León.

The club was founded in 2013 and its playing venue is Pedro Delgado with capacity of 2,800 seaters.

History
Segovia Futsal was founded in 2013 after the demise of historical club Caja Segovia. It started playing in Segunda División after being invited by the Royal Spanish Football Federation.

Four years later, the club achieves the promotion to Primera División.

Season to season

4 seasons in Segunda División

Current squad

External links
Official website

 
Sport in Segovia
Futsal clubs in Castile and León
Futsal clubs established in 2013
2013 establishments in Castile and León